The 1934 Kentucky Derby was the 60th running of the Kentucky Derby. The race took place on May 5, 1934. The win by the Brookmeade Stable of  Isabel Dodge Sloane marked the fifth time in Derby history that a woman was the winning owner. Horses Prince Pompey, Thomasville, Howard, Blue Again, & Riskulus were scratched before the race.

Full results

 Winning breeder: F. Wallis Armstrong (NJ)

References

1934
Kentucky Derby
Derby